Thiru. Vi. Ka. Nagar or TVK Nagar or Thiru. V. Kalyaanasundaram Nagar, named after the Tamil scholar Thiru. V. Kalyanasundaram, is a developed residential area in North Chennai, a metropolitan city in Tamil Nadu, India.

Location
The neighbouring places of Thiru. Vi. Ka. Nagar are :
Peravallur (0.5 km),
Agaram (0.8 km),
Sembium (1 km),
Periyar Nagar (2 km),
Kolathur (Chennai)|Kolathur (2 km),
Moolakadai (2 km),
Kodungaiyur (3 km),
Ponniammanmedu (3 km),
Vyasarpadi (4 km),
Madhavaram (5 km),
Madhavaram Milk Colony (5 km),
Vinayagapuram (5 km),
Doveton(5 km),
Purasaiwalkam (5 km),
Vepery (5.5 km),
Mathur MMDA (6 km),
Manali (7 km),
Puratchi Thalaivar Dr. M.G. Ramachandran Central railway station (8 km),
Sengundram (Red Hills) (11 km)
Chennai Egmore railway station (9 km),
Broadway Bus Terminus (10 km).

Constituency
Thiru. Vi. Ka. Nagar is located within the new Kolathur Constituency created after the delimitation of constituencies in 2008. Another constituency named after Thiru. Vi. Ka. Vi. Ka. Nagar Constituency which is also created after the delimitation of constituencies in 2008. Thiru. Vi. Ka. Nagar is  not represented in Thiru. Vi. Ka. Nagar Constituency which represents the areas of Perambur(part), Ayanavaram, Otteri, Pattalam, Pulianthope.

Greater Chennai Corporation Zone
Thiru. Vi. Ka. Nagar is also a zone in the Greater Chennai Corporation. It is one of the 15 zones of the Greater Chennai Corporation in which, it contains wards 64 to 78. It is named as the 6th Zone of the Greater Chennai Corporation in Central Chennai Region.

Entertainment
Thiru. Vi. Ka. Nagar has a wide range of entertainment venues such as cinemas and parks nearby. Perambur has the first shopping mall of the north Chennai Spectrum Mall. It also consists of a 5 screen Multiplex named S2 Cinemas which is controlled by theater franchise SPI Cinemas. Other nearby theatres are Sri Brinda Theatre (Perambur), Ganga Cinemas (Kolathur, (Chennai)), Sri Shanmuga Cinemas (Moolakadai), Pandian Theatre (Kodungaiyur), Iyyapa Theatre (Erukkancherry). Perambur has also got Chennai's first Disco Water park named Murasoli Maran Flyover Park which is always crowded in the weekends.

Transportation

Railways

Perambur is served by three railway stations. They are Perambur, Perambur Carriage Works and Perambur Loco Works. Thiru. Vi. Ka. Nagar can be easily accessed from any of the three stations.

MTC Buses
MTC has a bus terminus in Thiru. Vi. Ka. Nagar. The bus terminus is located on  Sundararaja Perumal Koil street ( North ) amidst Thiru. Vi. Ka. Nagar. Ayanavaram, Perambur, Madhavaram, Alandur depots of MTC operate buses to Thiru. Vi. Ka. Nagar .

Sub-neighbourhoods
 Thiru. Vi. Ka. Nagar
 Gandhi Nagar
 Anbazhagan Nagar
 Ramamurthy Colony
 Vetri Nagar
 Kennedy Square
 Gopalapuram
 Krishna Nagar

Roads and Streets
Pallavan salai
SRP koil street (North)
Bashyam street

Adjacent communities

References

Neighbourhoods in Chennai
Cities and towns in Chennai district